The Men's 200m T46 had its first round held on September 8 at 9:15 and the Final on September 9 at 18:16.

Medalists

Results

References
Round 1 - Heat 1
Round 1 - Heat 2
Round 1 - Heat 3
Final

Athletics at the 2008 Summer Paralympics